Judith Glacier is a glacier about  long, flowing from the vicinity of Mount Hamilton northeastward to enter Byrd Glacier just east of Mount Tuatara. It was named by the Advisory Committee on Antarctic Names for Commander Joseph H. Judith, U.S. Navy, commanding officer of  during U.S. Navy Operation Deep Freeze 1963.

References

Glaciers of Oates Land